John Stansfield, Stansfeld or Stanfield may refer to:

 Jack Stansfield (1896–?), English professional footballer
 John Stansfeld (1855–1939), English doctor, Anglican priest and philanthropist
 John Raymond Evelyn Stansfeld (1880–1915), English army officer
 John Stanfield (1868–1934), Canadian Nova Scotia industrialist and politician in the Canadian House of Commons and Senate
 John Standfield, English agricultural labourer, one of the Tolpuddle Martyrs

See also
 Stansfield (surname)
 Stansfield (disambiguation)
 Stansfeld (surname)
 Stanfield (surname)
 Standfield